Charles Philibert-Thiboutot (born 31 December 1990) is a Canadian middle-distance runner. He competed in the 1500 metres at the 2015 World Championships in Athletics and at the 2016 Olympics, reaching semifinals on both occasions. He won a bronze medal in this event at the 2015 Pan American Games. In 2013 and 2015 Philibert-Thiboutot was selected as Canadian Interuniversity Sport Athlete of the Year.

In 2022 he set a new Canadian record winning the Boston Athletic Association (B.A.A.) men's 5K in a time of 13 minutes 35 seconds, breaking Paul Williams' time of 13:36 set in 1986.

International competitions

1Representing the Americas

Personal bests
Outdoor
800 metres – 1:47.57 (Indianapolis, 2014)
1000 metres – 2:18.38 (Montréal, 2021)
1500 metres – 3:34.23 (Monaco, 2015)
Mile – 3:52.97 (Falmouth, MA, 2021)
2000 metres - 4:56.88 NR (Quebec City, 2022) 
3000 metres - 7:44.86 (Quebec City, 2021)
5000 metres – 13:12.76 (San Juan Capistrano, 2022)
5 kilometres - 13:35 NR (Boston, 2022)
10000 metres - 28:45.42 (Burnaby, 2020) 
Indoor
1000 metres – 2:21.02 (Montreal, 2015)
1500 metres – 3:39.64 (Val-de-Reuil, 2021)
Mile - 3:55.33 (New York, 2017)
3000 metres – 7:46.22 (Seattle, 2017)
5000 metres - 13:30:79 (Boston, 2019)

References

External links

 
 
 
 
 
 

1990 births
Living people
Sportspeople from Quebec City
Canadian male middle-distance runners
World Athletics Championships athletes for Canada
Pan American Games track and field athletes for Canada
Pan American Games medalists in athletics (track and field)
Athletes (track and field) at the 2015 Pan American Games
Athletes (track and field) at the 2016 Summer Olympics
Olympic track and field athletes of Canada
Pan American Games bronze medalists for Canada
Laval Rouge et Or athletes
Medalists at the 2015 Pan American Games
20th-century Canadian people
21st-century Canadian people